Five ships of the Royal Navy have borne the name HMS Lurcher

 was a 6-gun cutter, previously the French Comtesse d'Ayen.  She was captured in 1761 and sold in 1763.
 was a 6-gun cutter launched in 1763 and sold in 1771.
 was an 8-gun cutter launched in 1774 and sold in 1778.
The French captured her in 1781 but the British recaptured her the next year and renamed HMS Lurcher in 1783. She reverted to HMS Pigmy later that year, and was wrecked in 1793.
 was an  launched in 1912 and sold in 1922.

In addition to these vessels, His Majesty's 12-gun hired armed cutter  served the Royal Navy from 1795 until a French privateer captured her in 1801.

Citations and references
Citations

References

Gossett, William Patrick (1986) The lost ships of the Royal Navy, 1793-1900. (London: Mansell). 

Royal Navy ship names